Isle of Man competed at the 2018 Commonwealth Games in the Gold Coast, Australia from April 4 to April 15, 2018. Isle of Man announced it would send a squad of 32 athletes. However, Mark Cavendish did not compete.

Cyclist Jake Kelly was the country's flag bearer during the opening ceremony.

Medalists

Competitors
The following is the list of number of competitors participating at the Games per sport/discipline.

Athletics

Isle of Man announced a team of 3 athletes (2 men, 1 woman) would compete at the 2018 Commonwealth Games.

Track & road events

Field events

Badminton

Isle of Man announced a team of 4 athletes (1 man, 3 women) would compete at the 2018 Commonwealth Games.

Singles

Doubles

Cycling

Isle of Man announced a team of 10 athletes (8 men, 2 women) would compete at the 2018 Commonwealth Games. However, Mark Cavendish withdrew from the team due to an injury.

Road
Men

Women

Track

Pursuit

Points race

Scratch race

Mountain bike

Gymnastics

Isle of Man announced a team of 1 athlete (1 woman) would compete at the 2018 Commonwealth Games.

Artistic
Women
Individual Qualification

Individual Finals

Lawn bowls

Isle of Man announced a team of 2 athletes (2 men) would compete at the 2018 Commonwealth Games.

Men

Shooting

Isle of Man announced a team of 6 athletes (4 men, 2 women) would compete at the 2018 Commonwealth Games.

Men

Women

Swimming

Isle of Man announced a team of 5 athletes (1 man, 4 women) would compete at the 2018 Commonwealth Games.

Men

Women

Triathlon

Isle of Man announced a team of 1 athlete (1 woman) would compete at the 2018 Commonwealth Games.

Individual

References

Nations at the 2018 Commonwealth Games
Isle of Man at the Commonwealth Games
2018 in Manx sport